Edna's Imprisonment is a 1911 silent short drama film produced by the Edison Manufacturing Company. It starred Miriam Nesbitt and Yale Boss. Released through the General Film Company.

Cast
Edna May Weick as Edna 
Miriam Nesbitt  
Yale Boss as The Office Boy
Guy Coombs 
Charles M. Seay

References

External links
 Edna's Imprisonment at IMDb.com

1911 films
American silent short films
1911 short films
American black-and-white films
Edison Manufacturing Company films
Silent American drama films
1911 drama films
1910s American films